Hypomesus is a genus of smelts (Osmeridae), consisting of five species found in the northern hemisphere.

Species
There are currently five recognized species in this genus:
 Hypomesus japonicus (Brevoort, 1856)
 Hypomesus nipponensis McAllister, 1963 (Japanese smelt)
 Hypomesus olidus (Pallas, 1814) (Pond smelt)
 Hypomesus pretiosus (Girard, 1854) (Surf smelt)
 Hypomesus transpacificus McAllister, 1963 (Delta smelt)

The pond smelt H. olidus is widespread across northeastern Asia, Alaska, and northwestern Canada, while the Delta smelt H. transpacificus is an endangered species of the Sacramento Delta in California.  H. chishimaensis was at one time thought to be a separate species, but has since been identified as a population of H. nipponensis.

References 

 
Extant Chattian first appearances
Chattian genus first appearances
Marine fish genera
Freshwater fish genera
Ray-finned fish genera
Taxa named by Theodore Gill